Woodman was launched at Gainsborough in 1808. She traded with northern Spain and then became a West Indiaman, and later a government transport. From 1816 on she made several voyages to India and South East Asia, sailing under a licence from the British East India Company (EIC). She also made two voyages transporting convicts, one to New South Wales (NSW) in 1823 and one to Van Diemen's Land in 1825. She was lost in 1836.

Career
Woodman first appeared in Lloyd's Register (LR) in 1808.

In 1813 the EIC had lost its monopoly on the trade between India and Britain. British ships were then free to sail to India or the Indian Ocean under a licence from the EIC. On 26 February 1816 Woodman, Butler, master, sailed for Bombay under a licence from the EIC. 

On 7 February 1818, Woodman, H.Bear, master, sailed for Batavia. She arrived at Batavia on 27 July 1818.

On 5 June 1820 Woodman, Kellie, master, sailed to Bengal.

Convict voyage to New South Wales (1823): Captain Henry Ford sailed from the Thames on 22 August 1823 and arrived at Cork on 13 September. There Woodman took on both female convicts and about half as many free settler women and children. She sailed from Cork on 25 January 1823, bound for New South Wales. She stopped at Rio de Janeiro on 20 March, where she stayed for three weeks. She arrived at Sydney on 25 June. She had embarked 97 convict women, three of whom died on the voyage. On 20 August, Woodman, Ford, master, sailed for Calcutta.

Convict voyage to Van Diemen's Land (1825–1826): Captain Daniel Leary sailed from Sheerness on 6 December 1825. Woodman left the Cape of Good Hope on 4 March and arrived at Hobart on 29 April. She had embarked 150 male prisoners, four of whom died on the voyage. Three officers and 21 men of the 39th Regiment of Foot and 19 men of the 57th Regiment of Foot provided the guard. Woodman sailed from Hobart to Sydney, and then left Sydney on 17 September, bound for London. She encountered bad weather, which slowed her voyage prior too her arriving at Rio de Janeiro. She arrived safely at London on 17 April 1827.

In 1832 new owners transferred Woodmans registration to Bristol.

Loss
Woodman was lost in 1836.

Notes, citations, and references
Notes

Citations

References
 
 
 

1808 ships
Age of Sail merchant ships of England
Convict ships to New South Wales
Convict ships to Tasmania
Maritime incidents in 1836